Riviera is a suburb of Johannesburg, South Africa. It is located in Region E of the City of Johannesburg Metropolitan Municipality.

History
The suburb is situated on part of an old Witwatersrand farm called Braamfontein. It would be proclaimed as a suburb on 31 July 1903 as is named after the French or Italian Riviera.

References

Johannesburg Region E